"If You Could Read My Mind" is a song by Canadian singer-songwriter Gordon Lightfoot. Lightfoot wrote the lyrics while he was reflecting on his own divorce. It reached  1 on the Canadian Singles Chart on commercial release in 1970 and charted in several other countries on international release in 1971.

Theme
Lightfoot has cited his divorce for inspiring the lyrics, saying they came to him as he was sitting in a vacant Toronto house one summer. At the request of his daughter Ingrid, he performs the lyrics with a slight change: The line "I'm just trying to understand the feelings that you lack" is altered to "I'm just trying to understand the feelings that we lack." He has said in an interview that the difficulty with writing songs inspired by personal stories is that there is not always the emotional distance and clarity to make lyrical improvements such as the one his daughter suggested.

Production

The song was produced by Lenny Waronker and Joe Wissert at Sunwest Recording Studios in Los Angeles, California, with strings arranged by Nick DeCaro.

Composition
The song is in A major and uses the subtonic chord.
According to Duran Duran lead singer Simon Le Bon, the chorus of their song "Save a Prayer" was based on "If You Could Read My Mind".

Format releases
This song first appeared on Lightfoot's 1970 album Sit Down Young Stranger, later renamed If You Could Read My Mind following the song's success.

Chart performance
On release, the song reached No. 1 on the Canadian Singles Chart and was his first recording to appear in the U.S., reaching No. 5 on the Billboard Hot 100 singles chart in February 1971. Later in the year, it reached No. 27 on the Australian singles chart and No. 30 on the United Kingdom's singles chart. The song also reached No. 1 for one week on the Billboard Easy Listening chart, and was the first of four Lightfoot releases to reach No. 1.

Rights infringement legal action
In 1987, Lightfoot filed a lawsuit against Michael Masser, the composer of Whitney Houston's hit "The Greatest Love of All", alleging plagiarism of 24 bars of "If You Could Read My Mind"; the transitional section that begins "I decided long ago never to walk in anyone's shadow" of the Masser song has the same melody as "I never thought I could act this way and I got to say that I just don't get it; I don't know where we went wrong but the feeling's gone and I just can't get it back" of Lightfoot's song. 

Lightfoot has stated that he dropped the lawsuit when he felt it was having a negative effect on the singer Houston because the lawsuit was about the writer and not her. He also said that he did not want people to think that he had stolen his melody from Masser. The case was settled out of court, and Masser issued a public apology.

Charts

Weekly charts

Year-end charts

Stars on 54 version

The house music collective Stars on 54—consisting of Amber, Jocelyn Enriquez, and Ultra Naté—recorded a version of the song for the 1998 film 54, reaching No. 3 on Australia's ARIA Singles Chart and Canada's RPM Singles Chart, as well as No. 6 in New Zealand and No. 10 in Spain. Australian music channel Max included this version of "If You Could Read My Mind" in its list of 1000 Greatest Songs of All Time in 2012.

Critical reception
Can't Stop the Pop called "If You Could Read My Mind" "one of the most mind-bogglingly brilliant cover versions of the ‘90s", adding that it "remains a deeply fabulous single" and "a proudly ‘90s homage to disco that is as uplifting and joyous as there could be – and can now be rightly enjoyed as a triumphant celebration of everything that 54 represents."

Music video
A music video was made to accompany the single release. It pays homage to aspects of the disco-era presented through a ‘90s lens. Amber and Ultra Naté perform in a room where every surface is covered in LED dancefloor tiles. Jocelyn Enriquez is swinging on a giant disco ball. In the end, the singers performs together on the stage in a night club, all three dressed in red outfits. In between these scenes, several clips from the movie 54 are shown.

Track listings

Charts

Weekly charts

Year-end charts

Certifications

Other notable cover versions
A 1980 cover by Viola Wills peaked at No. 2 for five weeks on the dance/disco charts with a dance version of the song and at No. 80 in Australia. Duane Steele reached No. 32 on the Canadian country charts with his version in 1998.

See also
 List of number-one adult contemporary singles of 1971 (U.S.)

References

External links
 Lyrics of this song
 Page about song at Canadian Encyclopedia

1970 singles
1970 songs
1974 singles
1998 singles
Amber (singer) songs
Barbra Streisand songs
Colleen Hewett songs
Duane Steele songs
Glen Campbell songs
Gordon Lightfoot songs
Jocelyn Enriquez songs
Pop ballads
Reprise Records singles
Song recordings produced by Lenny Waronker
Songs written by Gordon Lightfoot
Tommy Boy Records singles
Ultra Naté songs
Viola Wills songs